Ana Cecilia Herrera Gómez is an Ecuadorian politician who was elected to the National Assembly of Ecuador.

Life 
Herrera represents the province of Cotopaxi at the National Assembly of Ecuador. She occupies seat number 31. In November 2021 she was one of the 81 politicians who abstained which allowed the Economic Development and Fiscal Sustainability Law to be passed. Other abstainers included Gissella Molina, Dina Farinango and Patricia Sánchez.

In September 2022 the murder and presumed femicide of the lawyer María Belén Bernal gained international importance and the case was debated in the assembly and mentioned in the United Nations. Femicide in Ecuador is a problem and a specific offence which some believe is underreported in Ecuador. A five-woman team proposed by Pamela Aguirre was appointed to oversee the investigation after the main suspect, a police officer, had fled. The team members were Ana Herrera, Mireya Pazmiño, Marjorie Chávez, Yeseña Guamaní and Amada Ortiz who was still an independent member. Herrera was to lead the team with Guamani as the vice-president.

References 

Living people
Year of birth missing (living people)
21st-century Ecuadorian women politicians
21st-century Ecuadorian politicians
Members of the National Assembly (Ecuador)
Women members of the National Assembly (Ecuador)